Västanå is a village situated in Bromölla Municipality, Skåne County, Sweden with 130 inhabitants in 2005.

Västanå iron mine
In 1800 an iron ore deposit was discovered and mining began in 1804. Till the closure in 1917, 1500 tonnes of iron ore were mined. Several new minerals were discovered in that mine. For example Christian Wilhelm Blomstrand discovered berlinite trolleite augelite attacolite,  and westanite in 1868 in the iron mine.

Further reading
Västanå iron mine
Västanå Iron Mine
 Blomstrand C W (1868) Om Westanå mineralier, Öfversigt af Kongl. Vetenskaps-Akademiens Förhandlingar, 25, 197-212

References

Populated places in Skåne County